Lagoa is a city and municipality in the district of Faro, in the Portuguese region of Algarve. The population of the municipality in 2011 was 22,975, in an area of 88.25 km². Its urban population, in the city of Lagoa proper, is 6,100 inhabitants. An important travel destination, its coast has won numerous accolades. Marinha Beach was considered by the Michelin Guide as one of the 10 most beautiful beaches in Europe and as one of the 100 most beautiful beaches in the world.

History
According to some historical sources, the earliest settlement in the area occurred along the edges of small lakes or marshes, which were drained in order to create a fertile land. There are many pre-historic vestiges of the early settlements, including menhirs (standing stones), funerary necropoles and artifacts that date a human presence to remote history. After the Celtiberian era, including the age of Cynete presence and domination, followed by the arrival of the Roman Empire and then the Visigoths, the entire region of the Algarve was conquered and ruled by Arabs when they moved into the Iberian peninsula in the 8th century.

When the area was later reconquered in the mid-12th century by Christian forces from the north, it was integrated into the fledgling Kingdom of Portugal. Muslim influence in Lagoa was profound, from the rich patrimony left behind, not only in neighboring Silves (then taifa capital), but also in Lagoa where commerce thrived.

During the 14th century, a favorable confluence of conditions allowed Lagoa to develop rapidly. Yet, the events of the 1755 Lisbon earthquake left little marks from this period: the reconstruction wiped away many of its classic architecture (there are a rare few of this period, including the churches of Estômbar and Porches).

The coastal zone was, for centuries, attacked by barbary pirates and corsairs, and those responsible for public security erected various defensive structures along the coast, such as the fortresses of Nossa Senhora da Rocha, Carvoeiro and São João de Ferragudo, in addition to the lookouts and redoubts, such as the tower of Lapa or Marinha.

For a long period, Lagoa was governed within the municipality of Silves. On the 16 January 1773, a foral (charter) was issued by King Joseph I, incorporating the municipality of Lagoa, after its principal settlement (Lagoa) was elevated to the status of town.

The local natural resources contributed to the current economic structure of the municipality, with agriculture (especially fruit and wine production), fishing, light industry and, later, tourism influencing the activities of the region. The fishing industry (in the communities of Ferragudo, Benagil, Carvoeiro and Senhora da Rocha), vineyards, and the traditional products of irrigated agriculture were the principal sources of wealth for the area until the 1970s. Driven by the abundance of fish, the canning and conserve industry at the beginning of the 20th century was responsible for an economic boom, that brought a general prosperity and wealth to the region.

From the 1960s, however, tourism increasingly became the main driver of the area's economic development and creation of brand new infrastructure. This has brought an increase in job creation, its growth rapidly became the economic engine of the municipality, and it has now assumed a prominent place in the local economy. In parallel to the growth of tourism, the growth of all the related activities, especially in the construction industry, services, and commerce in general, resulted in the elevation of Lagoa to the status of city (cidade).

Geography

Physical geography

Lagoa is bounded on the north and east by the municipality of Silves, west by Portimão, and fronts the Atlantic Ocean to the south. The city proper is about 35 to 59 meters above sea level, with most of it standing above 45 meters high.

Lagoa is a municipality rich in beaches. They have been improved dramatically over the last few decades, in terms of infrastructure and access, as well as in terms of water quality and the environment. They now successfully compete with the better known beaches of Portimão and Albufeira. The largest beaches are: 

 Praia de Albandeira
 Praia da Angrinha
 Praia do Barranco
 Praia do Barranquinho
 Praia de Benagil
 Praia dos Beijinhos
 Praia dos Caneiros
 Praia do Carvalho
 Praia de Carvoeiro
 Praia da Corredoura
 Praia da Cova Redonda
 Praia de Ferragudo
 Praia Grande
 Praia da Malhada do Baraço
 Praia da Marinha
 Praia do Mato
 Praia da Mesquita
 Praia do Molhe
 Praia Nova
 Praia de Nossa Senhora da Rocha
 Praia do Pau
 Praia do Pintadinho
 Praia dos Tremoços
 Praia do Vale de Centeanes

Human geography

The four civil parishes that provide local administrative control are:

 Estômbar e Parchal
 Ferragudo
 Lagoa e Carvoeiro
 Porches

All the civil parishes, excluding the city of Lagoa proper which is the seat of the entire municipality made of 4 civil parishes, have obtained the social designation of towns, although they administratively govern a disperse region of rural-urban agglomerations.

Economy 

Lagoa is one of the most important tourist areas of the Algarve. There are various factors which have contributed to its popularity, namely the variety of offerings to visitors (the beauty of its beaches, modern tourist accommodation, its golf courses and cultural heritage), orderly planning of land use within the municipality area (council area), its social stability, and the friendliness of its citizens. The city continues to improve facilities and organize events of interest to tourists. 

Each summer it hosts a large exhibition of craft products at the Parque de Feiras e Exposições de Lagoa (Fair and Exhibition Grounds of Lagoa), known by its official name's acronym FATACIL. Certain heritage buildings have been renovated for cultural uses in the city, notably the Municipal Library and the Convento de São José (St. Joseph Convent) – the Cultural Centre of the City of Lagoa – where various shows and a variety of exhibitions take place. Similarly the Municipal Auditorium hosts numerous shows and other events each week. Many cultural activities take place at the Parque Municipal de Fontes, north of Estômbar, all year round, including theatre, dances, and traditional folk-songs. In the 2000s and 2010s, Lagoa registered one of the highest levels of economic development in the Algarve. It has nowadays numerous supermarkets (ALDI, Auchan, Apolónia, Intermarché and Pingo Doce), medical offices, educational (elementary, secondary, music, art) institutions as well as sports, leisure and tourism facilities. Lagoa DOC is a Portuguese wine region centered around Lagoa municipality.

Architecture

Civic
 Congress Centre of Arade
 Lighthouse of Alfanzina
 Lighthouse of Ponta do Altar
 Railway Station of Lagoa

Military
 Castle of Estômbar / Castle of Abenabece
 Fort of Our Lady of the Incarnation
 Fort of Our Lady of the Rock, a medieval castle is situated in the civil parish of Porches, overlooking the cliffs of the parish; inside the fort is the Chapel of Nossa Senhora da Rocha, of uncertain date.
 Castle of Saint John of Arade / Fort of Saint John of Arade

Religious
 Church of Our Lady of Light
 Convent of Our Lady of Mount Carmel
 Convent of Saint Joseph
 Convent of Saint Francis
 Church of Saint James the Great
 Church of Our Lady of Incarnation, the 16th century church of the Encarnation, is a Baroque-era temple that includes vaulted-ceiling decorated in azulejo tile, and gilded chancel;
 Church of Our Lady of Conception
 Church of Mercy of Lagoa
 Church of Mercy of Estômbar
 Hermitage of Saint Antony
 Holy Well

Notable people 
Remexido (1796–1838) a notorious guerrilla leader of the Algarve
Hermínio da Palma Inácio (1922–2009) a Portuguese revolutionary against the Salazar dictatorship and airplane hijacker
Vasco Joaquim Rocha Vieira (born 1939) a retired Portuguese Army officer, the last Governor of Macau

See also
 Craft, Tourism, Agricultural, Commercial and Industrial Fair of Lagoa
 Lagoa DOC

References

External links

 Lagoa Municipality
 Lagoa Municipality Magazine
 Photos of Lagoa

 
Populated places in Faro District
Municipalities of the Algarve
Seaside resorts in Portugal
Towns in Portugal
Municipalities of Faro District